The 2015 KNSB Dutch Single Distance Championships were held at the Thialf ice skating rink in Heerenveen from Friday 31 October 2014 to Sunday 2 November 2014. Although the tournament was held in 2014 it was the 2015 edition as it is part of the 2014–2015 speed skating season.

Schedule

Medalists

Men

Women

Source:

References

External links
 KNSB

Dutch Single Distance Championships
Single Distance Championships
2015 Single Distance
KNSB Dutch Single Distance Championships, 2015